Con-Nichiwa is an annual anime convention held during April at the DoubleTree by Hilton Hotel Tucson – Reid Park in Tucson, Arizona.

Programming
The convention typically offers a cosplay cafe, cosplay parade, J-Fashion show, maid cafe, masquerade, panels, and vendors.

History
The convention moved from the Holiday Inn Palo Verde to the Tucson Convention Center in 2014 due to growth. Con-Nichiwa shared the Tucson Convention Center with a Bernie Sanders 2016 election campaign event. Con-Nichiwa 2020 was moved from June to November due to the COVID-19 pandemic, but was later cancelled.

Event history

References

External links
 Con-Nichiwa official website

Anime conventions in the United States
Recurring events established in 2010
Annual events in Arizona
Festivals in Tucson, Arizona
Tourist attractions in Tucson, Arizona
2010 establishments in Arizona
Conventions in Arizona